Basil Kilani (born 6 August 1960) is a Jordanian long-distance runner. He competed in the men's 5000 metres at the 1984 Summer Olympics.

References

1960 births
Living people
Athletes (track and field) at the 1984 Summer Olympics
Jordanian male long-distance runners
Olympic athletes of Jordan
Place of birth missing (living people)
20th-century Jordanian people